Nolensville is a town in Williamson County, Tennessee. Its population was 13,829 at the 2020 census. It was established in 1797 by William Nolen, a veteran of the American Revolutionary War. Located in Middle Tennessee, it is about 22 miles southeast of Nashville. The town was reincorporated in 1996.

Geography
Nolensville is located at  (35.956786, -86.666967).

History
This area was settled by European Americans after the American Revolutionary War, when pioneers began to move west of the Appalachian Mountains. William Nolen, a war veteran, his wife, Sarah, and their five children were passing through the area in 1797 when their wagon wheel broke. Surveying his surroundings, Nolen noted the rich soil and abundance of natural resources. He decided to settle here and the community was later named for him as Nolensville. William Nolen purchased a portion of a land grant made to Jason Thompson, on which Nolensville later developed. Nolen's historic house was moved to a new location in 2009.

In the early 19th century, a large migration from Rockingham, North Carolina, brought the Adams, Allen, Barnes, Cyrus, Fields, Glenn, Irion, Johnson, Peay, Scales, Taylor, Vernon, Wisener, Williams, and other families to the area. Built along Mill Creek, the town was incorporated in 1839.

Foraging and skirmishing took place here during the Civil War. Gen. John Wharton's Confederate cavalry unit was stationed in town briefly and Gen. Joseph Wheeler's command captured a Union supply train here on December 30, 1862. A small group of soldiers from the 2nd Minnesota Volunteer Infantry successfully defended a Union wagon train against a much larger Confederate cavalry force in February 1863, with several of them earning the Medal of Honor for their actions.

From the post-Reconstruction period into the early 20th century, Whites lynched a total of five African Americans in Williamson County. They did not allow the legal system to prosecute these men, but conducted extrajudicial murder. Among the victims was 15-year-old Samuel Smith, an African American who was lynched in Nolensville in December 1924. He was arrested there for shooting and wounding Ike Eastwood at his house, after Eastwood shot Smith's uncle; the grocer also shot and wounded Smith. Smith was taken for treatment to a hospital in Nashville. A group of masked men took him from the hospital, and with a larger mob, back 22 miles to Nolensville. There, the mob hanged the youth near Eastwood's house and shot him multiple times. Although the Nashville Chamber of Commerce offered a $5000 reward in the case, no one was convicted of Smith's murder. On June 5, 2017, a plaque was installed in his memory at St. Anselm Episcopal Church in Nashville; it memorialized two other local lynching victims, as well.

Post-World War II to present
On both sides of Nolensville Road, from north of Oldham Drive to the south as far as York/Williams Road, are many structures from the 19th century that are still in use as homes and/or stores. The Home Place Bed and Breakfast was built in 1820 as a private residence.  Within the described area above is a historic section, which in the 19th century was the center of Nolensville. Of note are the Waller Funeral Home, built in 1876; the Nolensville Mill Company, which operated from 1890 to 1986 (today it houses a store featuring Amish goods); and the Nolensville Co-Op Creamery, which operated from 1921 to 1957. Now serving as an antique store, the creamery had produced butter known for its excellence throughout the area. The house north of the cemetery today serves as a veterinary clinic.

Nolensville voted by referendum to reincorporate in August 1996. In October 1996, the first election was held, electing the first three-member Nolensville board of mayor and aldermen. The first mayor of Nolensville was Charles F. Knapper, elected along with Aldermen Thomas "Tommy" Dugger, III, and Parman Henry.  The town for the first time hired a town attorney, Robert J. Notestine, III.

Since 1996, Nolensville has had sustained growth. New home developments have been built around the town, including Bent Creek, Winterset Woods, Burkitt Place, Silver Stream, Ballenger Farms, Sunset Farms, and Summerlyn. Nolensville has had 290 residential building permits since the 2010 census; it boasts of having the lowest property tax rates in Williamson County. Other signs of growth are the new multimillion-dollar town hall, proposals for multiuse developments, and a high level of investment in commercial real estate.

To accommodate the many new students brought by families settling in the area, the Williamson County School Board purchased  on the south side of Nolensville for the construction of new elementary, middle, and high schools. These opened in the fall of 2016.

Demographics

2020 census

As of the 2020 United States census,  13,829 people, 2,405 households, and 2,164 families were residing in the town.

2010 census
As of the census of 2010, 5,861 people in 1,831 households lived there. The racial makeup of the town was 85.5% White, 5.3% African American, 0.2% Native American, 6.3% Asian, 0.6% from other races, and 2.1% from two or more races. Hispanics or Latinos of any race were 2.8% of the population.

About 77.1% of households were married couples living together, and 9.6% were not families; 8.3% of all households were made up of individuals. The average household size was 3.25, and the average family size was 3.45.

In the town, the age distribution was 41.9% under 18, 1.8% from 18 to 24, 27.3% from 25 to 44, 23.7% from 45 to 64, and 5.3% who were 65 or older. The median age was 33 years. For every 100 females, there were 93.5 males.

The median income for a household in the town was $102,982, and for a family was $105,589. Males had a median income of $71,114 versus $36,190 for females. The per capita income for the town was $33,705. About 4.5% of families and 5.2% of the population were below the poverty line, including 4.7% of those under  18 and none of those age 65 or over.

Education and schools

Nolensville area schools:

 Nolensville Elementary School
 Mill Creek Elementary School
 Sunset Elementary School
 Sunset Middle School
 Mill Creek Middle School
 Nolensville High School

Recreation

Nolensville has two public parks, an indoor recreation center, an outdoor pool/splash pad, and an extensive trail system. These facilities host a variety of different organized activities, including youth sports leagues, fitness classes, and town holiday celebrations.

Little League World Series
Little League teams from Nolensville participated in both the 2021 and 2022 Little League World Series, thus becoming, respectively, the 9th and 10th teams to qualify in Tennessee history. The 2022 team finished in fourth place out of a 20-team field.

Government

Nolensville changed its charter from mayor-aldermanic to manager-commissioner in the fall of 2020. Legislative power is vested in the board of commissioners, while day-to-day executive functions are handled by the town manager. The current Town Manager is Victor Lay.

References

External links
 NolensvilleTN.gov Official Town of Nolensville website
 

Towns in Tennessee
Towns in Williamson County, Tennessee
Cities in Nashville metropolitan area
Populated places established in 1797
1797 establishments in Tennessee